The 1962 Maryland gubernatorial election was held on November 6, 1962. Incumbent Democrat J. Millard Tawes defeated Republican nominee Frank Small Jr. with 55.64% of the vote.

Primary elections
Primary elections were held on May 15, 1962.

Democratic primary

Candidates
J. Millard Tawes, incumbent Governor
George P. Mahoney, perennial candidate
David Hume
Morgan L. Amaimo
Lester Posner
Charles J. Luthardt Sr.
William George Bennett Crain

Results

Republican primary

Candidates
Frank Small Jr., former U.S. Representative
Karla M. E. Balentine
Jeseph L. Pavlock

Results

General election

Candidates
J. Millard Tawes, Democratic
Frank Small Jr., Republican

Results

References

1962
Maryland
Gubernatorial
November 1962 events in the United States